Acrostiba is a genus of beetles belonging to the family Staphylinidae.

The species of this genus are found in Northern Europe.

Species:
 Acrostiba borealis Thomson, 1861 
 Acrostiba tibetana Bernhauer, 1933

References

Staphylinidae
Staphylinidae genera